Grzegorz Witold Kleszcz (born November 12, 1977, in Oława) is a Polish weightlifter. He is a three-time Olympian and a bronze medalist for the super heavyweight class at the 2001 European Weightlifting Championships in Trenčín, Slovakia.

Kleszcz made his official debut for the 2000 Summer Olympics in Sydney, where he hauled 405 kilograms in total for an eighth-place finish in the men's heavyweight class (105 kg).

At the 2004 Summer Olympics in Athens, Kleszcz switched to a heavier class by competing this time in the +105 kg category. He was able to carry 190 kg in the snatch, and 225 kg in the clean and jerk, for a total of 415 kg, finishing only in tenth place.

At the 2008 Summer Olympics in Beijing, Kleszcz competed for his second time in the men's +105 kg class. Kleszcz placed seventh in this event, as he successfully lifted 185 kg in the single-motion snatch, and hoisted 234 kg in the two-part, shoulder-to-overhead clean and jerk, for a total of 419 kg.

References

External links
NBC 2008 Olympics profile

Polish male weightlifters
1977 births
Living people
Olympic weightlifters of Poland
Weightlifters at the 2000 Summer Olympics
Weightlifters at the 2004 Summer Olympics
Weightlifters at the 2008 Summer Olympics
People from Oława
Sportspeople from Lower Silesian Voivodeship
European Weightlifting Championships medalists
20th-century Polish people
21st-century Polish people